The Río Piedras Mosque or Puerto Rico Islamic Center is a mosque in Río Piedras, San Juan, Puerto Rico.

History
In 1981, a building was purchased and converted into the Río Piedras Mosque. It became the first mosque in Puerto Rico.

Architecture
The mosque has a capacity of 200 male worshipers and 40 female worshipers.

See also
 Islam in Puerto Rico

References

External links

 

1981 establishments in Puerto Rico
Buildings and structures in San Juan, Puerto Rico
Mosques completed in 1981
Mosques in Puerto Rico
Río Piedras, Puerto Rico